This is a list of renamed places in Angola.

Country 
Prior to independence in 1975, Angola was known as Portuguese Angola, or occasionally Portuguese West Africa. Upon independence, the country was renamed the Republic of Angola.

Cities and towns 
 Teixeira da Silva → Bailundo (1975)
 Benguella → Benguela (1975)
 Vila Robert Williams → Caála (1975)
 Concelho → Caconda (1975)
 Amboim → Cabela → Gabela
 Huambo → Nova Lisboa (1928) → Huambo (1975)
 Silva Porto → Kuito (1975)
 Loanda → Luanda (1975)
 Teixeira de Sousa → Luau (1975)
 Sá da Bandeira → Lubango
 Vila Luso → Luena (1975)
 São Salvador → M'banza-Kongo (1975)
 Serpa Pinto → Menongue (1975)
 Moçâmedes → Namibe (1985) → Moçâmedes (2016)
 Vila Salazar → N'dalatando (1975)
 Kissonde → Benguela → Benguela Velha → Porto Amboim (1923)
 Henrique de Carvalho → Saurimo (1975)
 Santo António do Zaire → Soyo (1975)
 Novo Redondo → Sumbe (1975)
 Porto Alexandre → Tômbwa (1975)
 Uíge → Vila Marechal de Carmona (1955) → Carmona → Uíge (1975)
 Santa Comba → Waku-Kungo (1975)

Proposed 
 Porto Amboim → Gunza/Porto Gabela
 Cabinda → Tchiowa

Other places 
 University of General Studies of Angola → University of Luanda (1968) → Agostinho Neto University (1985)

See also 
 Lists of renamed places

References 

Angola history-related lists
Angola
Angola, renamed places
Angola geography-related lists
Angola
Angola